Belgian Railways may refer to:

Rail transport in Belgium
National Railway Company of Belgium (SNCB/NMBS) (est. 1926), the national railway operator of Belgium 
Belgian State Railway (1834–1926), national railway operator, predecessor of SNCB/NMBS
Infrabel, the national railway infrastructure company of Belgium